Bleda is an unincorporated community in Scott County, in the U.S. state of Missouri.

History
Bleda was originally called "Caney Creek", and under the latter name was founded in 1873. A post office called Bleda was established in 1892, and remained in operation until 1916. The present name is a transfer from Blida, Algeria.

References

Unincorporated communities in Scott County, Missouri
Unincorporated communities in Missouri